Oldeouwer  is a village in De Fryske Marren municipality in the province of Friesland, the Netherlands. It had a population of around 85 in 2017.

History
It was first mentioned in the 13th century as Antiqua huer, and means "old bank". In 1840, it was home to 46 people.

Before 2014, Oldeouwer was part of the Skarsterlân municipality and before 1984 it was part of Doniawerstal.

References

External links

De Fryske Marren
Populated places in Friesland